Chlaenandra is a genus of flowering plants belonging to the family Menispermaceae.

Its native range is New Guinea.

Species:
 Chlaenandra ovata Miq.

References

Menispermaceae
Menispermaceae genera